National Life Group is the trade name of National Life Insurance Company and its affiliates that offers life insurance and annuity products for individuals, families, and businesses. National Life Insurance Company was chartered in 1848 by the Vermont General Assembly.

History 
National Life Insurance Company was chartered by the Vermont Legislature on November 13, 1848. It has been insuring people for 175 years and was one of the first mutual life insurance companies in the U.S. The company wrote its first policy on the life of Daniel Baldwin, a resident of Montpelier, on January 17, 1850. It also paid its first death claim only a few months after its founding at the death of Rowland Allen, who had bought two policies for face amounts of $500 each. Rowland died while traveling to California in 1850. Other past insurance customers have included passengers on the Titanic, as well as victims of the 1918 influenza epidemic.

The company became a member of the Vermont Chamber of Commerce in 1957. National Life offers a range of financial services, including life insurance coverage and retirement plans, and annuities. The Group’s customer base was 843,000 in 2016, and in 2017 the face value of its life insurance policies was just over $100 billion.

The company is based in Montpelier, Vermont, with additional offices in Addison, Texas. Several member companies make up National Life Group, including Life Insurance Company of the Southwest. Equity Services, Inc., a registered broker-dealer and investment advisor, is an affiliate of National Life. In 2017, National Life sold Sentinel mutual funds to Touchstone Investments.

In 2019, National Life Group expanded it's strategic partnership with NTT DATA to accelerate digital transformation.

In 2019, National Life Group expanded its partnership with Cognizant, an IT consulting corporation.

In March 2020, the company’s CEO, Mehran Assadi, was awarded the Transformative CEO Award for Customer Experience in the insurance category by The CEO Forum. 

Authors Jackie and Kevin Freiberg, who wrote NUTS! Southwest Airlines’ Crazy Recipe for Business and Personal Success, feature National Life Group in their book CAUSE!. This, however, was a paid engagement - similar to an advertisement placed in Business Insider. It is currently ranked #747,240 in Amazon Books, a statistic loosely reflective of the content’s value.

Corporate Responsibility 
Founded in 2006, the National Life Group Foundation, the company's charitable foundation, sponsors various charitable events and programs focused on ending childhood hunger and supporting youth mental health. The Foundation helps sponsor the LifeChanger of the Year Award and the National Coalition for Safe Schools. In 2019 The Foundation funded the report, “Evidence-Based Strategies to End Childhood Food Insecurity and Hunger in Vermont”. In 2023, the budget for the Foundation was $2.3 million.

Do Good Fest 
Do Good Fest, the Foundation’s benefit concert, has raised more than $300,000 as of 2022. The money benefits the Branches of Hope cancer patient fund at Central Vermont Medical Center. This fund helps patients with non-medical financial burdens, such as utility bills, and gas and food purchases.

References

External links 

 Official website

Insurance companies of the United States
Financial services companies established in 1848
Financial services companies of the United States
Life insurance companies of the United States